Rahul Khullar (5 April 1953 – 23 February 2021) was an IAS officer of the 1975 batch and a former Chairman of the Telecom Regulatory Authority of India (TRAI).

Early life and education
Khullar was in the 1969 undergraduate batch in Economics at the St. Stephen's College, Delhi where he was a contemporary of economist Kaushik Basu and NITI Aayog Vice Chairman Rajiv Kumar. He completed his post-graduation from the Delhi School of Economics. He subsequently obtained a Ph.D in Economics from Boston University after joining the Indian Administrative Service in 1975.

Career
He was the Secretary of the Ministry of Commerce and Trade prior to his selection as Chairman of TRAI by the Appointments Committee of the Cabinet. He had a three-year term and one of the first orders of business for him was to sort out the various claims over the new auction and the 2G case. He was also a former Income Tax Commissioner.
In recent years, he had been teaching Economics and Mathematics at Vasant Valley School in New Delhi, India.

Personal life

He was married to IAS batchmate and former Chairperson of Niti Aayog Sindhushree Khullar and they have two daughters.

Death
He died on 23 February 2021, following a long illness.

References

External Links
Complete Biodata

1952 births
2021 deaths
Indian Administrative Service officers
Delhi School of Economics alumni